Adamawa state is a state in the North-East geopolitical zone of Nigeria, bordered by Borno to the northwest, Gombe to the west, and Taraba to the southwest, while its eastern border forms part of the national border with Cameroon. It takes its name from the historic emirate of Adamawa, with the emirate's old capital of Yola, serving as the capital city of Adamawa state. The state is one of the most heterogeneous in Nigeria, with over 100 indigenous ethnic groups, formed in 1991, when the former Gongola state was divided into Adamawa and Taraba states. Since it was carved out of the old Gongola State in 1991 by the General Ibrahim Badamsi Babangida military regime, Adamawa State has had 10 men, both military and civilian, controlling the levers of power, who played crucial roles in transforming the state into what it is today.

Of the 36 states in Nigeria, Adamawa state is the eighth largest in area, but the thirteenth least populous with an estimated population of about 4.25 million as of 2016. Geographically, the state is mainly composed of the highlands of mountains (the Atlantika, Mandara, and the Shebshi ranges) and the Adamawa Plateau, crossed by valleys and rivers, most notably the Benue and Gongola rivers. The lowlands of Adamawa are part of the West Sudanian savanna in the north and the wetter Guinean forest–savanna mosaic in parts of the south, while elevated areas are parts of the Mandara Plateau mosaic and Cameroonian Highlands forests ecoregions. In the extreme south of the state is part of the Gashaka Gumti National Park, a large wildlife park that contains large populations of bushbuck, African buffalo, patas monkey, black-and-white colobus, giant pangolin, and hippopotamus along with some of Nigeria's last remaining Nigeria-Cameroon chimpanzee, African leopard, and African golden cat populations.

What is now Adamawa state has been inhabited for years by various ethnic groups, including the Bwatiye (Bachama), Bali, Bata (Gbwata), Gudu, Mbula-Bwazza, and Nungurab (Lunguda) in the central region; the Kamwe in the north and central region; the Jibu in the far south; the Kilba, Marghi, Waga, and Wula in the north, and the Mumuye in the south, while the Fulani live throughout the state—often as nomadic herders. Adamawa state is also religiously diverse as about 35% of the population is Sunni Muslim and 40% is Christian (mainly Lutheran, EYN, ECWA, and Pentecostal), while the remaining 25% are adherents of traditional ethnic religions.

In the early 1800s, the Fulani jihad captured some of modern-day Adamawa state and formed the Adamawa Emirate under the Sokoto Caliphate. About 90 years later, forces from Germany and the British Empire defeated the Emirate in the Adamawa Wars and split the area. The British-controlled area (much of the west of modern-day Adamawa) was incorporated into the Northern Nigeria Protectorate, which later merged to constitute British Nigeria, before becoming an independent state-- Nigeria, in 1960. The German-controlled area formed a part of German Kamerun until allied forces invaded and occupied Kamerun during the Kamerun campaign of World War I. After the war, what is now eastern Adamawa state became most of the Northern Cameroons within the British Cameroons, until 1961, when a referendum led to its merger with Nigeria. Originally, modern-day Adamawa State was a part of the post-independence Northern Region until 1967 when the region was split and the area became part of the North-Eastern State. After the North-Eastern state was split in 1976, Gongola State was formed on 3 February 1976 alongside ten other states. Fifteen years after statehood, Gongola was split with the state's south becoming Taraba State while its north became Adamawa State.

As an agriculturally-based state, the Adamawa State economy mainly relies on livestock and crops, such as cotton, groundnuts, millet, cassava, guinea corn, and yams. Due to the Boko Haram insurgency affecting development in the state, Adamawa has the eleventh lowest Human Development Index in the country but as the insurgency has abated since 2016, development has renewed.

Geography

Adamawa is one of the largest states of Nigeria and occupies about 36,917 square kilometers. It is bordered by the states of Borno to the northwest, Gombe to the west and Taraba to the southwest. Its eastern border forms the national eastern border with Cameroon.

Topographically, it is a mountainous land crossed by the large river valleys – Benue, Gongola and Yedsarem. The valleys of the Mount Cameroon, Mandara Mountains and Adamawa Plateau form part of the landscape.

Climate Change 
A study conducted on climate change of three areas in Adamawa state of Nigeria in year 2012, that is Gyawana, Yola and Mubi, which represent the southern, central and northern senatorial zones of the state, has revealed that on a monthly basis, the mean temperature of these areas were on the rise while the annual rainfall were declining. Talking of rainfall in these areas at this period, there was delay in the start of rainfall, with a reduction in the length of rain fall in the areas.

Contrarily, in recent times, the humidity and temperature of Adamawa state, especially during the dry season, begins in November, which is usually very hot. The harmattan period is experienced between December and February every year.

In recent years, climate change in Adamawa state has begun to be more evident. Tropical wet and dry weather prevails in Adamawa State. The wet season lasts from April to October, whereas the dry season lasts for at least five months (November to March) yearly. An upsurge in rainfall in September in recent years is usually accompanied by floods. According to Dr. Sulieman Muhammad, the Executive Secretary of the Adamawa State Emergency Management Agency (ADSEMA), 25 people died in September 2022 due to floods brought on by both the overflow of water from the Lagdo Dam in Cameroon and severe rainfall.

In October 2022, additional flood claimed 37 lives and submerged 89,000 thousand hectares of farmlands with 58 others sustaining various degrees of injuries.

Economy

The major occupation of the people is farming, as reflected in their two notable vegetation zones, the Sub-Sudan and Northern Guinea Savannah zones. Their cash crops are cotton and groundnuts, while food crops includes; maize, yam, cassava, guinea corn, millet and rice.

The village communities living on the banks of the rivers, engage in fishing, while the Fulanis are cattle rearers. The state has a network of roads linking all parts of the country.

The development of many communities in the state can be traced to the colonial era when the Germans ruled a swath of territory known as the Northern and Southern Kameruns from Dikwa in the North to Victoria (Limbe) on the Atlantic coast in the 19th century. These were, however, handed over as United Nations Trust Territories to the British at the end of the World War I with the signing of the Treaty of Versailles. After a series of referendums, the Northern Kameruns joined Nigeria to form the then Sardauna Province, and the Southern Kameruns formed a Confederation with French speaking Cameroon.

Natural resources 

 Kaoline
 Bentonite
 Magnesite
 Gypsum

Religion

Adamawa is an Islam majority state in Nigeria, with a substantial Christian population. Historically, Adamawa is home to the major happenings of the Islamic Jihad, led by the Sokoto Caliphate in the early 1800s. Till today, the state of Adamawa is led traditionally by an Emir also known as Lamido, who is a descendant of the Islamic kings who conquered and ruled the area, prior to the amalgamation of Nigeria. Atiku Abubakar serves as the Waziri (Vizier) to the King of Adamawa. Adamawa is also home to the headquarters of two indigenous churches, the Church of the Brethren in Nigeria (EYN Church) with its headquarters in Mubi in the northern zone of the state, and the Lutheran Church of Christ in Nigeria (LCCN Church) with headquarters in Numan in the southern zone of the state. The Church of the Brethren in Nigeria (EYN church) was founded in Garkida Gombi Local Government of the state in March 1923 by American missionaries. The Lutheran Church of Christ in Nigeria (LCCN Church) was founded in Numan by Dutch missionaries in 1913.

History

Before it became a state in Nigeria, Adamawa was a subordinate kingdom of the Sultanate of Sokoto, which also included much of northern Cameroon. The rulers bear the title of emir ("" in the local language, Fulfulde).

The name "Adamawa" came from the founder of the kingdom, Modibo Adama, a regional leader of the Fulani Jihad organized by Usman dan Fodio of Sokoto in 1804. Modibo Adama came from the region of Gurin (now just a small village) and in 1806, received a green flag for leading the jihad in his native country. In the following years, Adama conquered many lands and tribes. In 1838, he moved his capital to Ribadu, and in 1839, to Joboliwo. In 1841, he founded Yola, where he died in 1848. After the European colonization (first by Germany and then by Britain), the rulers remained as emirs and the line of succession has continued to the present day.

A measles outbreak was reported in an internally displaced persons camp, in January 2015.

Emirs of Adamawa 
Emirs of Adamawa have included:

 Modibbo Adama ben Hassan, 1809–1848
 Lawalu ben Adama, 1848–1872 (son of the previous) 
 Sanda ben Adama, 1872–1890 (brother of the previous)
 Zubayru ben Adama, 1890–1901 (brother of the previous)
 Bobbo Ahmadu ben Adama, 1901–1909 (brother of the previous)
 Iya Ben Sanda, 1909–1910 (son of Sanda ben Adama)
 Muhammadu Abba, 1910–1924 (son of Bobbo Ahmadu ben Adama)
 Muhammadu Bello ben Ahmadu ben Hamidu ben Adamu, 1924–1928
 Mustafa ben Muhammadu Abba, 1928–1946 (son of Muhammadu Abba)
 Ahmadu ben Muhammadu Bello, 1946–1953
 Aliyu Mustafa, 1953–2010
 Muhammadu Barkindo Aliyu Musdafa, 2011–present

Boko Haram insurgency 
Adamawa State has been badly impacted by the Boko Haram insurgency. In January 2012, Boko Haram attacked Gombi, Mubi and Yola. By 2014, the state became home to camps housing an estimated 35,000 internally displaced people, fleeing violence from Boko Haram in locations including Mubi, Madagali, Askira Uba, Bama and Gwoza in the states of Adamawa, Borno, and Yobe. In 2014, an estimate placed the number of IDPs around Yola at 400,000. An attack occurred in Chakawa in 2014. A suicide bombing in Yola in 2015 killed over 30 people. A double suicide bombing in Madagali in 2016 killed over 50 people. Mubi is the worst affected place in Adamawa State, suffering major attacks in 2012, 2014, 2017 and 2018.

Organizations serving the community include the Adamawa Peace Initiative (API)- a group of business, religious, and community leaders - and the Adamawa Muslim Council. The United States Agency for International Development has pledged to provide continuing humanitarian assistance.

On 21–22 February 2020, Boko Haram terrorists launched an attack on homes and churches in Garkida, killing three soldiers and wounding civilians.

Education 
Tertiary institutions in Adamawa state include:
 Adamawa State Polytechnic, Yola
 Adamawa State University
 American University of Nigeria, Yola
 Federal College of Education, Yola
 Federal Polytechnic, Mubi
 Modibbo Adama University, Yola

Healthcare 
Adamawa state has many healthcare sectors that are of different levels, these levels are federal, state and local(grassroot) levels, these include:

Primary Healthcares 

 Basha Health clinic 
Dowaya Health Post
Gweda Malam Primary Health care center
Numan maternal and child primary health care
Sabon fegi primary health care center
Wayam primary health clinic
 Gbalapun primary health clinic
 Vulpi primary health care center
 Wisdom primary health care
 Bakta primary health care center

State Healthcares 

 General Hospital Numan

Sites of interest
 Mubi
 Nuhu Auwalu Wakili's Palace
 Sukur World Heritage Site
 Lamido's Palace
 American University of Nigeria
 Kamale Mountain Peak in Michika
 Three Sisters Rock in Song
 Kwandree Cold water spot at Michika
 Homtel Derivative and Suites
 The confluence of Rivers Benue and Gongola in Numan Uba under Mubi (Valanyi)

Local Government Areas

Adamawa State consists of twenty-one Local Government Areas (LGAs):

 Demsa
 Fufore
 Ganye
 Girei
 Gombi
 Guyuk
 Hong
 Jada
 Lamurde
 Madagali
 Maiha
 Mayo-Belwa
 Michika
 Mubi North
 Mubi South
 Numan
 Shelleng
 Song
 Toungo
 Yola North (State capital)
 Yola South

Languages
Languages of Adamawa State listed by LGA:

Government
The Governor of Adamawa State is the Executive, the State Legislature, Adamawa State House of Assembly, is located in Yola, the state capital.

Electoral System

The electoral system of each state is selected using a modified two-round system. To be elected in the first round, a candidate must receive the plurality of the vote and over 25% of the vote in at least two -third of the State local government Areas. If no candidate passes threshold, a second round will be held between the top candidate and the next candidate to have received a plurality of votes in the highest number of local government areas.

Notable people
* Atiku Abubakar
 Iya Abubakar
 Jibril Aminu
 Alex Badeh
 Mohammed Bello
 Aisha Buhari
 Done P. Dabale
 Aisha Dahiru Binani
 Ahmadu Umaru Fintiri
 Binta Masi Garba
 Boni Haruna
 Bindo Jibrilla
 Muhammadu Gambo Jimeta
 Aliyu Kama
 Babachir David Lawal
 Tahir Mamman
 Buba Marwa
 Abubakar Saleh Michika
 Boss Mustapha
 Murtala Nyako
 Bamanga Tukur
 Mahmud Tukur
 Mohammed Sanusi Barkindo
 Nuhu Ribadu
 Dr Bala Takaya
 Ibrahim Lamorde
 Ahmed Joda
 Abubakar Isa (Buba Shafani)

References

External links
 Adamawa.com - Articles, photographs, and art from Adamawa State

 
1991 establishments in Nigeria
States and territories established in 1991
States of Nigeria
French-speaking countries and territories